Imtihaan is a 1949 Bollywood Hindi romantic drama film directed by Mohan Sinha and starring Madhubala and Surendra in lead roles.

Cast 

 Madhubala as Roopa
 Surendra
 Sajjan
 Gulaab
 Madan Puri
 Cuckoo Moray

Soundtrack 
The soundtrack was composed by Shyambabu Pathak and lyrics were written by Indeevar and Harikrishna. Surendra, leading man of the film, had also sung a song named "Har Nafrat Ki Mohabbat Ne" for the film.

Reception 
Madhubala's biographer Mohan Deep called Imtihaan "a shabby film".

The film was successful commercially and was among the films that helped Madhubala establish herself as a leading lady. Her close friend and retired IAS officer Latif told, "After Mahal (her breakthrough film), Madhubala did eight films in 1949; all hits in some measure or the other. However Dulari, Singaar and Imtihaan stand out."

References

External links

1949 films